This article shows a list of railway stations in Greece. Currently (as of 2023), around 210 railway stations in Greece see a daily rail service. GAIAOSE a subsidiary of OSE is the body which manages and owns all railway stations in Greece, not including metro stations or Athens Airport station.

List of stations

References

External links
 List of OSE Stations OSE covers railways in mainland Greece only.

 
Railway stations
Transport
Lists
Greece
Greece